Robert Joseph Fisher (June 3, 1925 – February 11, 1989) was an American politician in the state of Tennessee. He served in the Tennessee House of Representatives from 1975 to 1980, sitting as a Republican.

In 1980, he was convicted of soliciting a $1,000 bribe from Carter County Sheriff George Papantoniou to kill a state bill the sheriff opposed. Fisher was fined $500 and received a 30 day suspended sentence, being expelled from the state legislature by a vote of 92–1. He was the first legislator in Tennessee to be expelled since 1866.

Fisher died in Mountain Home, Tennessee on February 11, 1989, at the age of 63.

References

1925 births
1989 deaths
Republican Party members of the Tennessee House of Representatives
People expelled from United States state legislatures
People from Johnson City, Tennessee